Steinunn may refer to:

Ragnhildur Steinunn Jónsdóttir (born 1981), Icelandic television personality, actress, and former Ms. Iceland
Steinunn Ólína Þorsteinsdóttir, Icelandic actress, writer and producer
Steinunn Finnsdóttir (c. 1640 – c. 1710), Icelandic poet
Steinunn Kristín Þórðardóttir (born 1972), Managing Director of Glitnir Bank in London, UK
Steinunn Refsdóttir, Icelandic skaldic poetic active at the end of the 10th century
Steinunn Sigurðardóttir (born 1950), Icelandic author
Steinunn Sigurðardóttir (fatahönnuður), Icelandic fashion designer
Steinunn Valdís Óskarsdóttir (born 1965), Icelandic politician, and a former mayor of Reykjavík

Icelandic feminine given names